Lockup is a prison documentary series, produced by 44 Blue Productions, which airs on MSNBC. The franchise also includes Lockup: Raw, Lockup: World Tour, Lockup: Extended Stay, Lockup: Disturbing the Peace, Lockup: Special Investigation, and Life After Lockup.

Overview
Lockup and the other series in the franchise explore jail and prison facilities throughout the United States, profiling notable inmates, incidents, and prison operations. A typical episode usually follows one or two inmates as they attend disciplinary hearings, receive visits from family, and interact with other inmates. In some episodes, inmates are provided with personal video cameras ("inmate cams") to use in their cells for recording their thoughts.

Titles within the franchise deal in specific areas as follows:

 Raw – Previously unaired footage from visits to various prisons, interspersed with comments from the production crew
 Extended Stay – Blocks of episodes that each focus on a long-term visit to one prison 
 World Tour – Visits to prisons in countries other than the United States
 Special Investigation – Focus on a specific aspect of the prison system, usually the juvenile justice system
 Life After Lockup – Inmates who have been released from prison and are trying to return to society

Most episodes end with a 'recap', explaining what happened to a given inmate (or, on occasion, a staff member) months or years after the taping; subsequent episodes will frequently return to a given prison (and/or a given inmate) to revisit them several months later.

The cancellation of Lockup was announced on June 29, 2016, with the twenty-fifth season as the series' last.

Episodes

References

External links
44 Blue Productions website
Series page at 44 Blue Productions
Series page at MSNBC

MSNBC original programming
2005 American television series debuts
2017 American television series endings
2000s American documentary television series
2010s American documentary television series
English-language television shows